{{Speciesbox
| image = Eudonia ustiramis female.jpg
| image_caption = Female
| image2 = Eudonia ustiramis male.jpg
| image2_caption = Male
| taxon = Eudonia ustiramis| authority = (Meyrick, 1931) 
| synonyms = 

| synonyms_ref = 
}}Eudonia ustiramis is a species of moth in the family Crambidae. This species is endemic to New Zealand. It is classified as "Data Deficient" by the Department of Conservation.

 Taxonomy 
This species was described by Edward Meyrick in 1931 using a specimen collected by S.C. Patterson in Whangārei in January and named Scoparia ustiramis. George Hudson discussed and illustrated this species in his 1939 book A supplement to the butterflies and moths of New Zealand. In 1988 John S. Dugdale assigned this species to the genus Eudonia''. The holotype specimen is held at the Natural History Museum, London.

Description 
Meyrick described the species as follows: 
The wing pattern of this species is variable and the holotype has strong dark longitudinal streaks on its forewings. Other specimens of this species have been confirmed through the comparison of male genitalia.

Distribution 
This species is endemic to New Zealand. For many years this species was only known from its type locality. However, in recent years it has been identified as a very locally common species of Northland and Auckland.

Habitat 
This species is known to inhabit gumland heaths.

Conservation status 
This species has been classified as having the "Data Deficient" conservation status under the New Zealand Threat Classification System.

References

External links

Image of holotype specimen.

Moths described in 1931
Eudonia
Moths of New Zealand
Endemic fauna of New Zealand
Taxa named by Edward Meyrick
Endemic moths of New Zealand